NGC 501, also occasionally referred to as PGC 5082 or GC 284, is an elliptical galaxy in the constellation Pisces. It is located approximately 224 million light-years from the Solar System and was discovered on 28 October, 1856 by Irish astronomer R. J. Mitchell.

Observation history 
Although John Dreyer, creator of the New General Catalogue, credits the discovery to astronomer William Parsons, 3rd Earl of Rosse, he notes that many of his claimed discoveries were made by one of his assistants. In the case of NGC 501, the discovery was made by R. J. Mitchell, who discovered it using Lord Rosse's 72" reflecting telescope at Birr Castle in County Offaly, Ireland. The object was described "very faint, small (E in Birr diagram)" in the New General Catalogue.

See also 
 Elliptical galaxy 
 List of NGC objects (1–1000)
 Pisces (constellation)

References

External links 

 
 SEDS

Elliptical galaxies
Pisces (constellation)
0501
5082
Astronomical objects discovered in 1856
Discoveries by R. J. Mitchell (astronomer)